The 1952 Copa Rio was the second and last edition of the Copa Rio, the first intercontinental club football tournament with teams from Europe and South America, held in Rio de Janeiro and São Paulo from 12 July to 2 August. Participant clubs were divided into two zones of four teams, playing each other once in a single round-robin tournament.

The tournament featured players such as Obdulio Varela, Roque Máspoli, Alcides Ghiggia, Juan Alberto Schiaffino of Peñarol, José Travassos of Sporting Lisbon, Didi, Joao Pinheiro of Fluminense, Luizinho, goalkeeper Gilmar of Corinthians and Roger Vonlanthen of Grasshopper.

The final was played in a two-legged format, contested by Brazilian teams Fluminense and Corinthians. Fluminense won the series 2–1 on points, achieving their first Copa Rio trophy.

Participants 

Notes
 Italian team Juventus (1951–52 Serie A champion) and Argentine club Racing (1951 Primera División champion) withdrew from the competition.

Venues

Tournament course

Rio de Janeiro Group
All matches played at Estádio do Maracanã.

 12 July: Peñarol 1−0 Grasshoppers
 13 July: Fluminense 0−0 Sporting 
 16 July: Peñarol 3−1 Sporting 
 17 July: Fluminense 1−0 Grasshoppers
 19 July: Sporting 2−1 Grasshoppers
 20 July: Fluminense 3−0 Peñarol

São Paulo Group
All matches played at Estádio do Pacaembu.

 13 July: Austria Wien 4–2 Libertad  
 13 July: Corinthians 6–1 Saarbrücken 
 16 July: Austria Wien 5–1 Saarbrücken 
 17 July: Corinthians 6–1 Libertad 
 19 July: Libertad 4–1 Saarbrücken 
 20 July: Corinthians 2–1 Austria Wien

Semi-finals
São Paulo
 July 24: (1st. leg) Corinthians 2–1 Peñarol 
 July 27: (2nd. leg) Corinthians w/o Peñarol

Rio de Janeiro
 July 23: (1st. leg) Fluminense 1–0 Austria Wien
 July 27: (2nd. leg) Fluminense 5–2 Austria Wien

Finals

Match details 

Fluminense won the series 2–1 on points

References 

1952 in Brazilian football
International club association football competitions hosted by Brazil
r
Sport Club Corinthians Paulista matches